Finsbury Central was a parliamentary constituency that covered the Clerkenwell district of Central London.  It returned one Member of Parliament (MP) to the House of Commons of the Parliament of the United Kingdom, elected by the first past the post system.

History 

The constituency was created when the two-member Finsbury constituency was divided by the Redistribution of Seats Act 1885 for the 1885 general election.  It was abolished for the 1918 general election, when it was replaced by a new single-member Finsbury constituency.

Boundaries

The constituency was created, in 1885, as a division of the parliamentary borough of Finsbury, in the historic county of Middlesex to the north of the City of London. The Redistribution of Seats Act 1885 provided that the constituency was to consist of the parish of St James and St John, Clerkenwell.

The seat was mostly located in the Clerkenwell district, with a detached portion at Muswell Hill containing about 5% of the population. The two areas were connected for historic reasons. The Social Geography of British Elections 1885-1910, explains that the Knights of St John had once owned more than half of Clerkenwell, including a deer park at Muswell Hill.

In 1889 Clerkenwell was severed from Middlesex to become part of the County of London.

In 1894, when the lower tier of local government in Middlesex was altered, the Muswell Hill area formed part of the Hornsey Urban District, which became the Municipal Borough of Hornsey in 1903.

In 1900 the lower tier of local government in London was rationalised. The old local boards and parish vestries were replaced, in the Clerkenwell area, by the Metropolitan Borough of Finsbury.

The local government changes did not affect the parliamentary boundaries until the redistribution of 1918, when the Central division ceased to be a separate constituency.

Members of Parliament

Election results

Elections in the 1880s

Elections in the 1890s

Elections in the 1900s

Elections in the 1910s

References

 Boundaries of Parliamentary Constituencies 1885-1972, compiled and edited by F.W.S. Craig (Parliamentary Reference Publications 1972)
 British Parliamentary Election Results 1885-1918, compiled and edited by F.W.S. Craig (Macmillan Press 1974)
 Social Geography of British Elections 1885-1910. by Henry Pelling (Macmillan 1967)

Parliamentary constituencies in London (historic)
Constituencies of the Parliament of the United Kingdom established in 1885
Constituencies of the Parliament of the United Kingdom disestablished in 1918
Politics of the London Borough of Islington